Elachista curonensis is a moth of the family Elachistidae. It is found in Italy.

References

curonensis
Moths described in 1990
Endemic fauna of Italy
Moths of Europe